The Lägern (also spelled Lägeren; 866 m) is a wooded mountain of the Jura Mountains, stretching from Baden to Dielsdorf, about 15 km north-west of Zurich. The culminating point is located 1 km west of Hochwacht within the canton of Zurich, the border with the canton of Aargau running on a slightly lower summit named Burghorn (859 m).

The Lägern lies in the easternmost part of the Jura Mountains, east of the river Aare. It is the highest summit of the range lying between the Rhine, Aare and Limmat. Its location east of the Aare makes it topographically connected to the Appenzell Alps, by the chain of hills running north of Lake Zurich.

The mountain is entirely traversed by a trail following the crest from Baden to Dielsdorf. From Dielsdorf a road also leads to Hochwacht, where a radar is operated by Skyguide (municipality of Boppelsen).

Climate

See also
List of most isolated mountains of Switzerland

References

External links

Lägern on Hikr

Mountains of Aargau
Mountains of the canton of Zürich
Mountains of Switzerland
Mountains of Switzerland under 1000 metres
Aargau–Zürich border